There are at least 66 game reserves in Pakistan.

List of hunting reserves

 Abbasia
 Askor Nallah
 Bahawalpur Plantation
 Bhon Fazil
 Bhono
 Bilyamin
 Bund Khush Dil Khan
 Chassi/Baushdar
 Chashma Barrage
 Chaupalia
 Cholistan
 Danyor Nallah
 Darosh Gol
 Daulana
 Deh Jangisar
 Deh Sahib Saman
 Diljabba-Domeli
 Dosu Forest
 Gat Wala
 Gehrait Gol
 Ghamot
 Gogi
 Goleen Gol
 Head Qadirabad
 Jabbar
 Kala Chitta
 Kathar
 Kazinag
 Khari Murat
 Khipro
 Kilik/Mintaka
 Killan
 Kot Zabzai
 Machiara
 Makhnial
 Mando Dero
 Mang
 Mirpur Sakro
 Moji
 Mori Said Ali
 Nar/Ghoro Nallah
 Nara
 Nazbar
 Nizampur
 Pai
 Pakora
 Parit Gol/Ghinar Gol
 Qazi Nag
 Rahri Bungalow
 Resi
 Sher Qillah
 Surjan, Sumbak, Eri and Hothiano
 Swegali
 Tando Mitha Khan
 Tangir
 Teri/Isak Khumari
 Thal
 Thanedar Wala
 Totali
 Vatala
 Wam
 Zangi Nawar
 Zawarkhan

See also
Wildlife of Pakistan
Protected areas of Pakistan
Environmental issues in Pakistan

References

Pakistan profile 
World Database on Protected Areas

Further reading
Country profile at Earthtrends
Review of 'Protected Areas System' in Pakistan
Protected areas systems at wildlifeofpakistan.com

External links
IUCN-Pakistan

Game reserves
Game reserves
Game reserves
Game reserves, Pakistan